Juan "John" or "Johnny" Ramos is a retired American soccer defender who spent played professionally in Germany and the United States.

Ramos graduated from J. P. Taravella High School.  He attended Nova Southeastern University, playing on the men's soccer team in 1992 and 1993.  He graduated with a bachelor's degree in psychology.

In 1996, Ramos signed with Spandauer BC.  He also played for Spandauer SV.  In 1997, he returned to the United States where he played for the Florida Strikers of the USISL D-3 Pro League.  In 1998, he played for the Jacksonville Cyclones.  In February 1999, the Miami Fusion selected Ramos in the second round (seventeenth overall) of the 1999 MLS Supplemental Draft.  The Fusion waived him on February 26, 1999.  He then played two games for the Boston Bulldogs in 1999.  Ramos played for Raleigh Capital Express.  In February 2006, he was signed by Miami FC of the USL First Division after attending an open tryout.

Ramos has coached extensively including Cypress Bay High School, American Heritage School and Plantation FC.

In 2016 Ramos was arrested on charges that he sexually abused a former player starting when she was 13 years old.

References

Living people
1971 births
Nova Southeastern Sharks men's soccer players
American soccer coaches
American soccer players
American expatriate soccer players
Boston Bulldogs (soccer) players
Florida Strikers players
Jacksonville Cyclones players
Miami FC (2006) players
Raleigh (Capital) Express players
USL First Division players
USL Second Division players
A-League (1995–2004) players
Expatriate footballers in Germany
Miami Fusion draft picks
Association football defenders